The Old Lee County Courthouse is a historic building at 2120 Main Street in Fort Myers, Florida. It was designed by Francis J. Kennard and its cornerstone was laid on April 13, 1915. It was added to the U.S. National Register of Historic Places in 1989.

References

Further reading
 Florida's Historic Courthouses by Hampton Dunn

External links
 Old Lee County Courthouse

County courthouses in Florida
National Register of Historic Places in Lee County, Florida
Buildings and structures in Fort Myers, Florida
1915 establishments in Florida
Government buildings completed in 1915